Turn Around, Look at Me is the third studio album by The Vogues.  It was their debut album for Reprise Records in 1968, after their previous label, the Pittsburgh based Co & Ce Records, folded.

The album was reissued, combined with the 1969 Vogues album Till, in compact disc format, by Taragon Records on November 6, 2001. The re-issue producer was Eliot Goshman.

Track listing

External reference

Reprise Records albums
1968 albums
The Vogues albums